The Loose Salute are a British band founded by drummer Ian McCutcheon of Slowdive and Mojave 3 who also sings and plays guitar.  The band consists Lisa Delatour Billson (vocals, keys, percussion), Charlotte King (vocals, percussion, bells and whistles), Alan Forrester (keys), Alden Evans (guitars) and Benjamin Wesley Morgan (bass).

In a departure from McCutcheon's past projects, The Loose Salute plays a dreamy, surf rock sounding chorus of music helped in live performance by friends and fans.  The band tries to encapsulate togetherness and loneliness, as well as surfing, partying, and beaches among other things in their music. The band spend their time in between London and Cornwall and use the Cornwall beaches and life as inspiration for their music. The Loose Salute are signed to Heavenly Records in the UK and Graveface Records in the US.

The name is apparently a reference to the Michael Nesmith album of the same name.

Discography

Albums
 Tuned to Love (released on 5 June 2007 on Graveface Records in the US)
 Tuned to Love (released on 2 June 2008 on Heavenly Records in the UK)
 Getting Over Being Under  (released on 7 June 2011 on Graveface Records)

EPs
 Suck It Up Buttercup (released in 2004)

Singles
 "Turn the Radio Up" (released on 19 May 2008)
 "Why'd We Fight?" (released on 13 October 2008)

References

External links
 Official website
 The Loose Salute myspace
 Guardian review
 Interview with Culturedeluxe
 Single Review

Dream pop musical groups
Surf music groups
British folk music groups